Gadiculus argenteus, or the silvery pout, is a species of cod found in the Northeast Atlantic region.

Gadiculus argenteus was until recently considered the only species in the genus Gadiculus, known as the silvery pouts, but composed of two subspecies, G. a. argentatus and G. a. thori. Currently, they are considered two separate species with different distributions: G. argenteus is  more southerly, occurring in the western Mediterranean  and in the Atlantic around the Strait of Gibraltar and to the south along the Moroccan coast, while G. thori is found from the Bay of Biscay north up to the North Cape.

References

Gadidae
Fish described in 1850